Labant is a surname. Notable people with the surname include:
Branislav Labant (born 1976), Slovak footballer
Vladimír Labant (born 1974), Slovak footballer

See also
Laband